I'm Glad It's You is an American rock band from Redlands, California.

History
The group's debut album, The Things I Never Say, was released in 2016. While touring in July 2017, the band's touring van overturned while driving near Barstow, California, which resulted in the death of their videographer, Chris Avis. This event informed the songwriting of their next album, Every Sun, Every Moon, which was produced by J. Robbins and released on 6131 Records in May 2020. Slant Magazine named the album one of its top 50 releases of 2020.<ref>The 50 Best Albums of 2020. Slant, December 9, 2020.</ref>

Members
Robi Brown - keyboards
TJ Moneymaker - bass
Kelley Bader - vocals
Evan Dykes - guitar
Elliott Glass - drums

DiscographyThe Things I Never Say (6131 Records, 2016)Every Sun, Every Moon'' (6131 Records, 2020)

References

Rock music groups from California
American emo musical groups